Paleśnica  is a village in the administrative district of Gmina Zakliczyn, within Tarnów County, Lesser Poland Voivodeship, in southern Poland.

The village has a population of 500.

The land around Paleśnica is mountainous in the southwest and flat in the southeast. The highest point in the area is 502 meters above sea level, and is located 1.6 km to the southeast of Paleśnica.

References

Villages in Tarnów County